Howard Michael Endelman (born July 30, 1965) is a former American lawyer, professional tennis player, businessman, and tennis coach.

Biography
Endelman, who grew up on New York's Long Island, played collegiate tennis at Columbia University, before turning professional in 1987.

Most of his matches on the professional tour were as a doubles player, reaching a career best doubles ranking of 183. His best performances on the Grand Prix circuit were quarter-finals appearances at Boston and Schenectady in 1988, partnering John Sobel on both occasions. He competed in the main draw of the men's doubles at the 1988 US Open, with Peter Palandjian.

Education and Career 
Retiring after the 1989 season, Endelman served as head coach of the women's tennis team at Columbia until 1992. He then studied at Boston College and graduated with a J.D. After practicing law for three years at the international law firm of Clifford, Chance, Rogers & Wells, he later moved on to a business career, which included positions as a Vice President in investment banking at Merrill Lynch from 1998 to 2005, an Executive Vice President at InsideOut Sports & Entertainment from 2005 to 2007, and as a founding partner of Baseline Partners, a private equity investment firm based in India from 2007 to 2010.

From 2010 until 2019 he was the associate head coach of the Columbia men's tennis team. He assumed the mantle of head coach in 2019 after head coach Bid Goswami retired.

Coaching career 

 Head Coach of Men's Tennis and Director of Tennis Operations - Columbia University, 2019–Present
 Associate Head Coach of Men's Tennis - Columbia University, 2010–2019
 Head Coach of Women's Tennis - Columbia University, 1989–1992

Source:

Challenger titles

Doubles: (2)

References

External links
 
 

1965 births
Living people
American male tennis players
Tennis people from New York (state)
Columbia Lions men's tennis players
Boston College Law School alumni
20th-century American lawyers
20th-century American businesspeople
21st-century American businesspeople
American tennis coaches